The 2017 Jackson State Tigers football team  represented Jackson State University in the 2017 NCAA Division I FCS football season. The Tigers were led by second-year head coach Tony Hughes and played their home games at Mississippi Veterans Memorial Stadium in Jackson, Mississippi as members of the East Division of the Southwestern Athletic Conference (SWAC). They finished the season 3–8, 3–4 in SWAC play to finish in fourth place in the East Division.

Schedule

Source: Schedule

Game summaries

at TCU

vs Tennessee State

at Grambling State

Arkansas–Pine Bluff

at Prairie View A&M

vs Tuskegee

Southern

at Mississippi Valley State

Alabama State

at Alabama A&M

Alcorn State

References

Jackson State
Jackson State Tigers football seasons
Jackson State Tigers football